The Xingcha Shenglan was a Chinese historical work written by Fei Xin. Fei Xin served as a soldier in the third, fifth, and seventh Ming treasure voyages under the command of Admiral Zheng He. The book contains descriptions of foreign places that the Chinese mariners had seen. The literary term "star raft" refers to an ambassador's flagship.

According to Dreyer (2007), Fei Xin's book was strongly influenced by Ma Huan's Yingya Shenglan. Ma Huan was a translator and interpreter on Zheng He's fourth, sixth, and seventh treasure voyage.

Fei Xin's original work comprised two chapters. However, he rewrote and illustrated the initial work before presenting it to the court.

See also
 Ma Huan's Yingya Shenglan [] 
 Gong Zhen's Xiyang Fanguo Zhi []

References

Citations

Sources 

 
 

Chinese history texts
15th-century history books
Travel books
Ming dynasty literature
Treasure voyages